The Z 27500 is a type of dual-voltage electric multiple unit trainset for the French National Railway Company (SNCF) intended to the TER network (French commuter rail).

The train is the electric variant of Bombardier AGC, often referred to as ZGC. It the most important fleet of all other AGC variants.

A total of 211 trainsets have been built by Canadian conglomerate Bombardier at its factory in Crespin (near Valenciennes, France) since 2005. The first set (Z 27503/27504) was placed into regular passenger service on 24 March 2005, for the Basse-Normandie region.

Design 
Bombardier vehicle design is articulated using bogies between carriages. The Z 27500 are available in three or four-car unit. The train can be operated as a multiple-unit control with up to three units, with other Z 27500 or the dual-mode version Diesel/ (B 81500). The train is equipped with 2 pantographs on the intermediate car.

Their capacity offers 160 seats in a three-car unit, 220 in a four-car set. The inter-carriage passages have wide, open gangway connections, limiting bottlenecking.

The Z 27500 from Lorraine region can be operated as a multiple-unit control with the Diesel variant, specifically equipped with a command to raise the pantograph.

Whereas the first trains were delivered in their three-car set version (with an intermediate car), several regions later added a second intermediate car, in order to increase their capacity from 160 to 220 seats.

Photo gallery

Operators and routes

TER Auvergne-Rhône-Alpes 
 Ambérieu-en-Bugey  - Bourg-en-Bresse - Mâcon
 Annecy - La-Roche-sur-Foron - Annemasse 
 Annecy - La-Roche-sur-Foron - Cluses - Saint-Gervais-les-Bains
 Annemasse - Thonon-les-Bains - Évian-les-Bains
 Annemasse - La Roche-sur-Foron - Bonneville - Cluses - Sallanches-Combloux-Megève - Saint-Gervais-les-Bains-Le Fayet
 Annecy - Grenoble - Valence
 Valence - Grenoble - Annecy -Thonon-les-Bains - Évian-les-Bains
 Lyon Perrache - Lyon Part-Dieu - Bourg-en-Bresse
 Lyon Part-Dieu - Culoz - Aix-les-Bains-Le Revard - Annecy
 Lyon Part-Dieu - Culoz - Bellegarde - Genève-Cornavin
 Lyon Part-Dieu - Culoz - Bellegarde - Annemasse - Thonon-les-Bains - Évian-les-Bains
 Lyon Part-Dieu - Culoz - Bellegarde - Annemasse - La Roche-sur-Foron - Bonneville - Cluses - Sallanches-Combloux-Megève - Saint-Gervais-les-Bains-Le Fayet

TER Bourgogne-Franche-Comté 

 Moulins-sur-Allier - Nevers
 Dijon - Laroche - Migennes
 Dijon - Mâcon - Lyon
 Dijon - Besançon - Belfort
 Dijon - Dole - Pontarlier
 Besançon - Mouchard - Lons-le-Saunier
 Lyon - Lons-le-Saunier - Besançon - Belfort
 Belfort - Meroux - Delle

TER Bretagne 

 Brest - Morlaix
 Brest - Landerneau
Rennes - Nantes
 Rennes - Saint-Malo
 Rennes - Saint-Brieuc
 Rennes - Redon
 Redon - Vannes - Lorient

TER Centre-Val de Loire 
 Tours - Bourges
 Tours - Blois - Orléans
 Tours - Saumur
 Tours - Poitiers
 Orléans - Nevers

TER Grand Est 

 Strasbourg - Saverne - Sarrebourg
 Strasbourg - Sélestat
 Bâle - Mulhouse
 Mulhouse - Belfort
 Mulhouse - Colmar
 Reims - Charleville-Mézières - Sedan
 Reims - Épernay - Château-Thierry
 Nancy - Épinal - Remiremont
 Nancy - Reims
 Nancy - Saint-Dié-des-Vosges
 Nancy - Longwy
 Nancy - Metz
 Nancy - Strasbourg
 Metz - Strasbourg
 Metz - Forbach

TER Normandie 

 Lisieux - Cherbourg
 Lisieux - Saint-Lô
 Lisieux - Trouville-Deauville
 Elbeuf - Saint-Aubin - Rouen - Yvetot
 Rouen - Mantes-la-Jolie
 Rouen - Amiens
 Rouen - Le Havre

TER Occitanie 
 Cerbère or Portbou - Avignon
 Cerbère or Portbou - Marseille
 Béziers - Neussargues
 Toulouse - Agen
 Toulouse - Brive La Gaillarde
 Toulouse - Narbonne
 Toulouse - Latour de Carol - Enveitg
 Toulouse - Pau

TER Pays de la Loire 

 Nantes station - Les Sables-d'Olonne
 Le Mans station - Le Croisic
 Angers station - Thouars
 Saint-Nazaire station - Redon
 Redon - Nantes
 Nantes - Rennes
 Rennes - Le Mans

Distribution of orders

Accidents 
 Runaway train TER Z 27500 between Formerie, Serqueux and Sommery on 20 October 2015. This incident occurred after the train hit 2 cows just after the Formerie station, without causing victims.
 Accident between a train TER Z 27500 and a stuck trailer truck on 16 October 2019 on the crossing n°70 at Boulzicourt. This accident caused the derailment of the train. 2 passengers were slightly injured as well as the train driver.

Models 
 The LS Models brand makes a model of the Z 27500 in 3 or 4-car set version in HO gauge.
 Different versions of AGC can be downloaded (free or paid) for Train Simulator game.

Future 

SNCF has announced on 18 March 2021, that 40% of the TER (French commuter rail) fleet will be renovated in the next 10 years, included Z 27500 Class.

See also 
 List of SNCF classes
 Autorail à grande capacité (AGC)

References

Literature 
  
 
 

Z 27500
Bombardier Transportation multiple units
Articulated passenger trains
Electric multiple units of France
Train-related introductions in 2005
25 kV AC multiple units
1500 V DC multiple units of France